Barisal ( or ;), officially known as Barishal, is a major city that lies on the banks of the Kirtankhola river in south-central Bangladesh. It is the largest city and the administrative headquarter of both Barisal District and Barisal Division. It is one of the oldest municipalities and river ports of the country. Barisal municipality was established in the year 1876 during the British rule in India and upgraded to City Corporation on 25 July 2002. Barisal is Bangladesh's third largest information technology and financial hub. The city consists of 30 wards and 50 mahallas with a population of 328,278 according to the 2011 national census and with the voter of about 2.48 lakhs according to the 2018 voter list of city election.  The area of the city is 58 km2.
The city was once called the Venice of the East or the Venice of Bengal.

History 
Barisal was conquered by Muhammad bin Bakhtiyar Khalji and was later a significant territory of the Delhi Sultanate and Bengal Sultanate. After the decline of the Suri Empire, the territory became a semi-independent area in the Mughal period because of heavy fighting between the Muslims and Hindu chiefs, although most parts of the city were totally under the control of the governors of the proto-industrialised Bengal Subah. In course of time, it fell under the Bengal Nawabs. Raja Ramranjan Chakravarty was put as a de jure king during the Bengal Presidency of the British, later passed to East Pakistan at independence and finally Bangladesh.

In ancient times, it was called Chandradwip (চন্দ্রদ্বীপ), while furing the Medieval Islamic times it was also known as Ismailpur & Bacola (বাকলা) in Europe. Ralph Fitch, the first ever Englishman, a leather merchant, known to have visited Bengal in the mid 1580s, described Barisal in his journal as, "From Chatigan in Bengal, I came to Bacola; the king whereof is a Gentile, a man very well disposed and delighted much to shoot in a gun. His country is very great and fruitful, and hath store of rice, much cotton cloth, and cloth of silk. The houses are very fair and high built, the streets large, and people naked, except a little cloth about their waist. The women wear a great store of silver hoops about their necks and arms, and their legs are ringed with silver and copper, and rings made from elephants' teeth."

The central city of this region is the city of Barisal. It is one of the biggest river ports in Bangladesh. It is a city with nearly 0.38 million people and a divisional headquarters, medical college, cadet college, some pharmaceutical industries, textile industries and the Bangladesh Inland Water Transport Authority's head office. Barisal is fast growing city of the country stands on the Kirtankhola River. Country's first short landing and take off airport has been completed in Barisal and a private Airlines named Air Bengal has begun its regular air flight between Dhaka Hazrat Shahjalal Airport and Barisal.

"Barisal guns" is a natural phenomenon named after Barisal; it is kind of a booming sound heard near lakes and rivers which is due to seismic activity under water, first heard in this region by the British in the 19th century.

Population

Demographics 
According to provisional results of the 2011 national census, the population of Barisal (areas under the jurisdiction of the Barisal city corporation) stands at 328,278. By gender, the population was 51.63% male and 48.37% female.

The literacy rate among the urban people of Barisal is 75.3%, which is significantly higher than the national average of 56.5%.

Most people in Barisal are Bengalis. The long-standing inhabitants of the city are known as Barisaliya and the most spoken Bengali dialect of this region is known as Bangali. Apart from them, the city population is composed of people from neighboring upazilas and districts (Patuakhali, Bhola, Pirojpur, Jhalakati, Barguna).

Religion 

The majority of Barisal's people are Muslims (89.30%), mainly Sunni Islam of the Hanafi school. Other religious groups include Hindus (9.7%), and very few numbers of other religions, mainly Christians (0.98%) and Buddhists (0.01%).

Since 2015, the Catholic minority has its own Roman Catholic Diocese of Barisal.

Geography 

Barisal city occupies an area of 58 km2.

Barisal District, with an area of 2790.51 km2, is bounded by Madaripur, Shariatpur, Chandpur and Lakshmipur districts on the north, Patuakhali, Barguna and Jhalokati District on the south, Bhola and Lakshmipur districts on the east, Jhalokati, Pirojpur and Gopalganj districts on the west. Several rivers flow across Barisal including the Kirtankhola, Arial Khan, Khoyrabad, Kalijira and Sandha.

Climate 
Barisal has a climate on the border between a dry-winter humid subtropical climate (Köppen (Cwa) and a tropical savanna climate (Aw).

Points of interest 

Durga Sagar: with an area of about 2,500 hectare, is the largest pond or dighi of southern Bangladesh. It is located at Madhabpasa village of babuganj upazila, about 11 km away from Barisal town. Locally it is known as Madhabpasha Dighi. According to a desire of Rani Durgavati, mother of Raja Joynarayan, the dighi was dug in 1780 (1187 BS). There are coconut trees around the dighi which together with the dighi are bounded by brick-walls. In the middle of the dighi, there is an island with bushes. Migratory birds usually come here during winter. The surrounding areas of the dighi has now been turned into a picnic spot.
Madhabpasha was a capital of the kingdom of Chandradvipa.

 Durga Sagar
 Baitul Aman Jame Masjid Complex
 Oxford Mission Church
 Bell's Park aka Bangubandhu Udyan
 Rupatoli area
 30 Godown
 Planet Park
 Muktijoddha Park
 Narikel Bagan & Horticulture (Agriculture Training Institute)
 Lakhutia Zamindar Bari
 Korapur Miah Bari Masjid
 Shankar Math
 Town Hall
 Sher-e-Bangla Memorial Museum
 Bir Sreshtho Captain Mohiuddin Jahangir Library and Museum
 Jibanananda Das Museum
 Dapdapia Bridge
 Bibir Pukur
 Shahid Shukkur-Gafur Memorial Park, Amanatganj
 Taltali Bridge, Amanatganj
 Padma Pukur (Pond of Lotus)
 Kali Mandir founded by the Poet Mukunda Das
 BadhyaBhumi Monument (বধ্যভূমি স্মৃতিসৌধ)
 Bangladesh Rice Research Institute Regional Centre (Coconut Garden)

Architecture 

Barisal's buildings are too diverse to be characterised by any particular architectural style, and have been built over a long period of time.

Some well known heritage buildings are:

 Guthia Baitul Aman Jame Mashjid Complex
 Kamalapur Mosque
 Rammohan Samadhi Mandir
 Sujabad Kella
 Sangram Kella
 Sharkal Fort
 Girja Mahalla
 Bangabondhu Uddyan
 Ebadullah Mosque
 Kasai Mosque
 Oxford Mission Church
 Shankar Math
 Kali Bari of Mukunda Das
 Joint Mosque at Bhatikhana
 Aswini kumar town hall
 Charkella
 Durgasagar Dighi
 One domed Qasba Mosque
 Fakir Bari Jame Mosjid
 Housing Estate Jame Mosjid
 Barisal Zilla School Building

Sports 
Cricket and football are the two most popular sports in Barisal while tennis and kabaddi are also popular. There is a national stadium in the city known as Barisal Divisional Stadium (also known as Abdur Rab Serniabad Stadium). It is a multi-purpose stadium and has a capacity of 15,000 spectators. It is currently used mostly for cricket matches. It is also used for football and other sports. Besides different organization share to stage a show there occasionally. Notable players from Barisal who have played for the national team include Shahriar Nafees, Sohag Gazi, Kamrul Islam Rabbi and Fazle Mahmud.

There is a regional sports training centre under Bangladesh Krira Shiksha Pratisthan (BKSP) situated at Rahamatpur in Barisal Barisal is also home to the Bangladesh Premier League franchise Fortune Barishal.

Transport

Air
Barisal Airport is a domestic airport. Biman Bangladesh Airlines, Novoair and US-Bangla Airlines use this port. Active air-route is Barisal-Dhaka-Barisal.

River port
Barisal River Port is the second largest river port of Bangladesh. It's the most popular way of communication for the people of Barisal to Dhaka, the capital city. It is also a popular transport system with other districts like Bhola, Barguna, Lakshmipur.

Road
Barisal is connected to most other regions of the country via the N8 national highway. There are two bus terminals in Barisal, Nathullabad Central Bus terminal and Rupatali Bus Terminal, which connect Barisal to other districts.

Education 

Barisal is home to many educational institutions. Govt. Brojomohan College is the oldest institution of higher education in the city, founded in 1889. There is a public university University of Barisal and two private universities, a government medical college Sher-e-Bangla Medical College (SBMC), a textile engineering college Shaheed Abdur Rab Serniabat Textile Engineering College and an engineering college Barisal Engineering College. There are also educational institutions like Barisal Zilla School, Barisal Cadet College, Govt. Syed Hatem Ali College, Government Women's College, Govt. Barisal College, Amrita Lal Dey College, Barisal Govt. Girls High School, Barisal Model School and College and Barisal Asmat Ali Khan Institution (A.K. School). Besides these there are three teacher training colleges, a Government Polytechnic institute, two technical institutes, a homeopathic college and a social welfare training centre.

Major institutions include:

 Amrita Lal Dey College
 Barisal Cadet College
 Barisal Engineering College
 Barisal Government Women's College
 Barisal Govt. Polytechnic Institute
 Barisal Zilla School
 Brojomohun College
 Government Syed Hatem Ali College
 Shaheed Abdur Rab Serniabat Textile Engineering College
 Sher-e-Bangla Medical College
 University of Barisal

Media
Barisal is a center for the newspaper, periodical and book publishers. Some locally published newspapers and periodicals are:

Newspapers

 Daily Ajker Barisal
 Daily Ajker Barta
 Daily Ajker Poribartan
 Daily Banglar Bone
 Daily Barisal Barta
 Daily Barisal Bhorer Alo
 Daily Barisal Pratidin
 Daily Bhorer Angikar
 Daily Biplobi Bangladesh
 Daily Dakkhinanchal
 Daily Motobad
 Daily Satya Songbad
 Daily Shahnama

Source:

Periodicals

 Bakerganj Parikrama
 Chirantan Bangla
 Upakul
 Gournadi Parikrama
 Khadem
 Jago Nare

Notable people

See also 
 Barisal City Corporation
 Barisal District
 Barisal Division

Notes

References

External links 

 Official City of Barisal website

 
Cities in Bangladesh
Populated places in Barisal District
River ports